In meteorological applications, a zonal wavenumber or hemispheric wavenumber is the dimensionless number of wavelengths fitting within a full circle around the globe at a given latitude.

Zonal wavenumbers are typically counted on the upper level (say 500-millibar) geopotential maps by identifying troughs and ridges of the waves. Wavenumber 1 has one trough and one ridge, i.e. one wavelength fits  degrees. Wavenumber 2 has two ridges and two troughs around 360 degrees.

Wavenumber 0 corresponds to zonal (symmetric) flow. Wavenumbers 1–3 are called long waves and often synonymous in meteorological literature with the mid-latitude planetary Rossby waves, while wavenumbers 4-10 are often referred to as "synoptic" waves. In the Northern Hemisphere, wavenumbers 1 and 2 are important for the time-mean circulation due to topography (Tibetan Plateau and Rocky Mountains), whereas in the Southern Hemisphere, tropical convection is responsible for the presence of mainly zonal wavenumber 3.

See also
Wavenumber

References

Atmospheric dynamics
Rates